"Local Boy in the Photograph" is the first single by rock band Stereophonics. The song is taken from their debut album, Word Gets Around and was released on 17 March 1997. The song reached number 51 in the UK Singles Chart. On 9 February 1998, the song was re-released and reached number 14 on the same chart.

Title and lyrics
During an interview with Sky Arts HD after his performance at the Hay Festival in June 2010, Kelly Jones explained the meaning of a few of his songs and said that "Local Boy in the Photograph" was based on the true story of local boy Paul David Boggis, who was killed by a train travelling between Cwmbach and Aberdare. All the songs on the album are about people and events in the Aberdare area.

Stuart Cable
Following the death of former Stereophonics drummer Stuart Cable, a campaign was launched on Facebook to get the song to number one in the UK charts. On 13 June 2010 it re-entered the UK charts at number 60.

Track listings
All music written by Kelly Jones, Richard Jones and Stuart Cable. All lyrics composed by Kelly Jones; Except where indicated.

Initial release (1997)

Re-release (1998)

Personnel
Stereophonics
Stuart Cable – drums
Kelly Jones – vocals, guitar
Richard Jones – bass guitar

Charts

Certifications

Other versions
 A live version was included on the "Traffic" single, live from Belfort Festival.
 A semi-acoustic version recorded for Radio One was released on the "Just Looking" single.
 A live version was included on the "Moviestar" single, recorded at SECC, Glasgow.
 A live version was included on the band's first Live album, "Live from Dakota".

References

External links
 Local Boy in the Photograph at Stereophonics.com

Songs about children
1997 singles
1997 songs
Songs based on actual events
Songs written by Kelly Jones
Stereophonics songs
V2 Records singles